Rosclogher is a barony  in County Leitrim, Ireland.

Etymology
Rosclogher barony takes its name from the townland of Rosclogher ("stony wooded height"), which gives its name to Rosclogher Castle.

Location

Rosclogher is found in north County Leitrim, reaching from its 3 km (2 mi) of Atlantic coastline (the least coastline of any coastal county), past Lough Melvin, east of the Kilcoo River, up to Saddle Hill.

Rosclogher barony is bordered to the south by Drumahaire, County Leitrim; to the north by Tirhugh, County Donegal; to the east by Magheraboy and Clanawley, County Fermanagh; and to the west by the barony of Carbury, County Sligo.

History
The O'Murroughs, or O'Murreys, were chiefs in the barony of Rosclogher. Their territory was the Hy Murragh. The Mac Murry or Mac Morrow were chiefs in Loghmoyltagh. The MacClancy's were chiefs of Dartraighe (Dartry) in the barony of Rosclogher. Uí Miadhachain (O'Meehan) is found here at the time of the Norman invasion of Ireland.

List of settlements

Below is a list of settlements in Rosclogher barony:
Kiltyclogher
Kinlough
Tullaghan

References

Baronies of County Leitrim